Sharbazher  District is a district of Sulaymaniyah Governorate in the Kurdistan Region, Iraq. It refers to the lands north of Sulaymaniyah or the lands behind the goyzha mountain.

References 

Districts of Sulaymaniyah Province